Abdelhamid Zerrifi (born 20 June 1986) is an Algerian athlete specialising in the 3000 metres steeplechase. He represented his country at the 2013 and 2015 World Championships without qualifying for the final. His personal best in the event is 8:25.96 set in Paris Saint-Denis in 2013.

Competition record

References

External links
 

1986 births
Living people
Algerian male steeplechase runners
World Athletics Championships athletes for Algeria
Place of birth missing (living people)
21st-century Algerian people